Philipp Hosiner (born 15 May 1989) is an Austrian professional footballer who plays as a striker for German side Kickers Offenbach.

Club career

Early career
He scored 12 goals in 31 matches for 1860 Munich II during the 2008–09 season. He scored one goal in 20 matches for SV Sandhausen during the 2009–10 season. He scored 16 goals in 38 matches for First Vienna FC for 2010–11 season.

Austria Wien
On 31 August 2012, Hosiner signed a three-year contract with FK Austria Wien having already scored five Bundesliga goals for Admira to start the season. On 27 October 2012, Hosiner scored his first hat-trick for Austria in their 6−4 win over his former club Admira. He followed this impressive performance up with another hat-trick in Austria's next league match, a 6−1 defeat of SV Ried. Just over a month later on 8 December 2012, Hosiner scored his third hat-trick of the season, guiding Austria Wien to a 6−3 win over Wolfsberger AC.

In his debut season with Austria Wien, Hosiner scored 32 league goals to finish as the "Torschützenliste", top scorer, of the Austrian Bundesliga. Hosiner was also voted as the "Player of the Season" in the Bundesliga as Austria Wien won their first league title since 2006 with a 4−0 win over SV Mattersburg on the final day of the season. However Hosiner failed to replicate his goal-scoring exploits in the final of the Austrian Cup on 30 May 2013, as Austria Wien fell to a 1−0 defeat to third division side FC Pasching, thanks to a goal from Daniel Sobkova. Hosiner was injured at the start of his second season at Austria Vienna, but he still managed to score 14 league goals in his final season at the club, before his move to French club Rennes.

Rennes
On 20 June 2014, Hosiner joined Rennes on a three-year deal. Hosiner made his debut for Rennes on 10 August 2014 in the first round of league fixtures, coming on as a second-half substitute for Abdoulaye Doucouré in the 2−0 loss. On 30 August, Hosiner came off the bench and won his side a penalty, which was converted by Ola Toivonen, to give Rennes a 1−0 victory over newly promoted Caen. On 29 October 2014, Hosiner scored the winner in Rennes 2–1 win over Marseille in the third round of the Coupe de la Ligue. Hosiner came on as a substitute in the match and scored with a beautiful back-heeled strike in injury time, to help Rennes knock Marseille out of the competition. Despite a decent start to his Rennes career, Hosiner was ruled out of playing for Rennes in the second half of the season, because a tumour was detected on his kidney during January 2015. He had his kidney removed in February 2015 and he remained sidelined, and out of action for the rest of the season.

1. FC Köln
On 22 June 2015, Hosiner was loaned to 1. FC Köln until the end of the season. He played 15 games but only managed to score one goal, against Hamburger SV.

Union Berlin
In 2016, Hosiner signed a three-year deal with 2. Bundesliga side Union Berlin. He scored six goals in 26 matches during the 2016–17 season. He scored two goals in 21 matches during the 2017–18 season.

Sturm Graz
On 11 July 2018, Hosiner signed transferred to Sturm Graz and signed a three–year contract.

Chemnitzer FC
On 2 September 2019, Chemnitzer FC announced the signing of Hosiner.

Dynamo Dresden
He signed for newly relegated 3. Liga side Dynamo Dresden in July 2020.

Kickers Offenbach
On 11 January 2022, Hosiner signed with fourth-tier Regionalliga Südwest club Kickers Offenbach.

International career
Hosiner made his senior debut for Austria on 7 October 2011 in a UEFA Euro 2012 qualifying match against Azerbaijan, coming on as an 88th-minute substitute for Marc Janko. His second cap, and first start, came on 22 March 2013, a 6–0 victory over the Faroe Islands in which Hosiner scored his first two goals for his country.

Career statistics

Club

International
Scores and results list Austria's goal tally first.

Honours

Club
Austria Wien
Austrian Football Bundesliga: 2012–13
Austrian Cup runner-up: 2012–13

Individual
Austrian Football Bundesliga Player of the Year: 2012-13
Austrian Football Bundesliga Top Scorer: 2012-13

References

External links
 

1989 births
Living people
People from Eisenstadt
Footballers from Burgenland
Association football forwards
Austrian footballers
Austria international footballers
Austria youth international footballers
Austrian Football Bundesliga players
2. Liga (Austria) players
Bundesliga players
2. Bundesliga players
3. Liga players
Regionalliga players
Ligue 1 players
TSV 1860 Munich II players
FC Admira Wacker Mödling players
FK Austria Wien players
SV Sandhausen players
First Vienna FC players
1. FC Köln players
Stade Rennais F.C. players
1. FC Union Berlin players
Chemnitzer FC players
Dynamo Dresden players
Kickers Offenbach players
Austrian expatriate footballers
Expatriate footballers in Germany
Austrian expatriate sportspeople in Germany
Expatriate footballers in France
Austrian expatriate sportspeople in France